Point Sur Lighthouse is a lightstation at Point Sur  south of Monterey, California at the peak of the  rock at the head of the point. It was established in 1889 and is part of Point Sur State Historic Park. As of 2016, and for the foreseeable future the light is still in operation as an essential aid to navigation. Point Sur is the only complete turn-of-the-20th-century lightstation open to the public in California. Three-hour walking tours guided by volunteers are available on Wednesdays and weekends throughout the year.

Light sources 

The lighthouse has had four different light sources during its history. First, it had an oil wick lamp, and then an oil vapor lamp. Three different fuels were used: whale oil, lard oil, and kerosene. Electricity wasn't introduced to the surrounding area and light house until the 1950s.

Since Point Sur was a major point used for navigation, it was equipped with first-order Fresnel lens, the largest made at the time. It weighed 4,330 pounds and included 16 panels of prisms, each with a bulls-eye in the center surrounded by concentric rings of prismatic glass.

Each ring projects the light beyond the previous one.

Foghorns 
In dense fog, the light beam might not be visible, so the lighthouse had a foghorn to alert ships. A coal-powered foghorn was installed when the light was used, but this labor-intensive system was replaced as soon as better technology was available. A steam-driven fog signal was installed by the turn of the century. It was fired by wood harvested from the redwoods of Big Sur. The steam boiler used about 100 cords of wood per year.

Diaphone horns were placed on top of the fog-signal room from 1935 to 1960. The two horns produced a two-tone "bee-oh" sound. In 1972, the "Super Tyfon Double Fog Signal," named after the giant Typhon from Greek mythology, was put into use. The modern electric tone fog signal was a 12 volt high frequency fog signal with a sound range of half a nautical mile. The high frequency was very effective in fog.

Structures 

The station’s staff was a head keeper and three assistant keepers. The families of the keepers lived at the station. The station had separate residences for the head keeper and the assistant keepers.

The lighthouse keepers and their families were relatively isolated at Point Sur. The station included all facilities needed for them to be self-sustaining. There was a well in the sand flats at the base of the rocks and a pump that filled a  cistern (later replaced by a water tower) at the station. A barn and a blacksmith shop was built. A carpenter shop held supplies for the keepers to do their own maintenance. The lamp tower, oil room, and fog signal room were all combined into one building because of limited space. The Old  Coast Road connected the  station to Monterey, but it was a nearly a full day's trip via wagon until the northern portion of the macadam Cabrillo-San Simeon Highway was completed in 1924.

Tourism 

The park contains California's only complete turn-of-the-20th-century lighthouse open to the public. (The nearby Point Pinos Lighthouse is also open to the public, but is significantly older.) Walking tours are held year-round on Saturdays, Sundays and Wednesdays, and also on Thursdays during July and August. Tours are first-come, first-served; visitors are advised to arrive a half-hour before the tour.

History 

In 1793, British explorer George Vancouver described the "small, high, rocky lump of land nearly half a mile from the shore." Point Sur has been a hazard to ships since California was first settled, and increased shipping traffic during the California Gold Rush beginning in 1849 caused many wrecks. In 1874, the United States Lighthouse Service (USLS) board stated,

Funding 

In 1886, Congress finally appropriated $50,000 (equivalent to $ in ) for construction of a lighthouse at Point Sur. Funding ran out and construction was stopped for several months until Congress appropriated another $50,000 in 1887.

Construction

In 1888, Joseph Post won the government contract to construct the road from the coastal road to the base of Point Sur. 

Twenty-five men were hired to build the road, lighthouse, and adjacent buildings.

The workers leveled the top to create room for the necessary buildings. They quarried sandstone and   granite. To transport the rock and building materials to the base of the point, they built  of railway track and a corduroy road (made from wooden planks) across the narrow, sandy neck of land that connected the point to the mainland. They built a 395-step staircase from the base to the peak. They also built a tramway to carry supplies from the base of the rock to the peak. 

By the end of the first year, all the rock had been quarried and construction of many buildings was well underway. The Lighthouse Board hoped the construction would be completed by the end of 1888, but an additional $10,000 was needed. In 1887–88, Congress paid $69,100.69 to three individuals to finish the station. The light station was completed and the lantern lit on August 1, 1889.

Isolated facility

Life on Point Sur was very isolated. The Old Coast Road that connected the Big Sur coast to Monterey was often impassable during bad weather.

The U.S. Lighthouse Service provided a horse and wagon to get mail and supplies from Pfeiffer's Resort (now part of Pfeiffer Big Sur State Park). Each family was allotted a garden area for fresh vegetables. Bulk supplies such as coal, firewood, animal feed, and some food came on a 'lighthouse tender' about every four months. One function of these long, broad ships was to service remote lightstations inaccessible by land. The tender would anchor south of the lightstation and send in a 20-foot whaler towing a skiff, both loaded with supplies. The sacks and barrels were hoisted in cargo nets to a platform at the base of the rock. They were then secured to a flat railcar and winched up to the dwelling area using a steam-driven donkey engine.

Like most remote lightstations, Point Sur was very self-sufficient. As the years passed, life became increasingly less isolated at Point Sur after the completion of the northern portion of Highway 1 in 1924, connecting Big Sur with Monterey to the north. Prior to the construction of Highway 1, the California coast south of Carmel and north of San Simeon was one of the most remote regions in the state, rivaling nearly any other region in the United States for its difficult access.

Coast Guard ownership

Two years later, the U.S. Coast Guard assumed responsibility for all aids-to-navigation. Lighthouse Service employees were absorbed into the new program, and allowed to become either members of the U.S. Coast Guard or remain civil service employees.

Historical landmark status

The site is now registered as California Historical Landmark #951. In 1991, the old lighthouse and a  area  was listed on the U.S. National Register of Historic Places as Point Sur Light Station.  In 2004, the Coast Guard transferred the building and land to California Department of Parks and Recreation.

Fresnel lens

The original Fresnel lens was moved in 1978 to the Allen Knight Maritime Museum of Monterey, where it was an exhibit. The Maritime Museum ceased operation and was renamed the Museum of Monterey.  The museum no longer wanted to retain the Fresnel lens as part of its collection. Interested individuals and groups began efforts to return the lens to the Point Sur Light Station. The lens is still owned by the United States Coast Guard who had to approve returning the lens. The nonprofit Central Coast Light Keepers collected more than $100,000 in donations to pay to return the lens. The project was approved in late 2017. The lens was disassembled, restored, and placed in storage until it can be moved to the lighthouse and reassembled in the lighthouse tower.

Shipwrecks 

Notable shipwrecks occurring near Point Sur:

 April 20, 1875 – Ventura
 April 22, 1894 – SS Los Angeles. The only witnesses were the survivors. The captain of the ferry Eureka met survivors at the Pacific Coast Steamship company's wharf in Los Angeles and discouraged them from talking to reporters.
 December 5, 1909 -Majestic
 October 3, 1915 – Catania
 July 21, 1916 – Shna-Yak
 September 23, 1921 – G.C. Lindquer
 September 16, 1922 – Thomas Wand
 March 4, 1923 – Babinda
 April 4, 1930 Panama
 March 30, 1930 – Rhine Maru
 November 25, 1933 – Lupine
 February 13, 1935 – USS Macon (ZRS-5)' May 24, 1946 – Frank Lawrence October 24, 1947 – Sparrows Point  May 14, 1956 Howard Olsen Head lightkeepers 

 James Nightwine (1889–1890)
 John F. Ingersoll (1890–1901)
 Ora O. Newhall (1901–1908)
 John W. Astrom (1908–1927)
 William Mollering (1927–1931)
 Thomas Henderson (1932–1938)
 Charles R. Coursey (1938–1944)

 In popular culture 

In 1967, the lighthouse (including the lantern room) and its surrounding buildings, were used as a filming location for an episode of the WWII-themed TV series, The Rat Patrol, entitled "The Two If By Sea Raid" (airdate: 12/18/67), standing in for a Nazi-held lighthouse on the Mediterranean coast of North Africa.

The lighthouse was rumored to be haunted and the location was investigated by the Travel Channel Ghost Adventures'' paranormal reality TV show.

See also 

 List of lighthouses in the United States

References

External links 

 Point Sur
 Point Sur State Historic Park
 
 
 

History of Monterey County, California
Lighthouses completed in 1889
Transportation buildings and structures in Monterey County, California
Lighthouses on the National Register of Historic Places in California
Renaissance Revival architecture in California
Historic districts on the National Register of Historic Places in California
National Register of Historic Places in Monterey County, California
Big Sur